The 1995 Indycar Australia was the second round of the 1995 CART World Series season, held on 19 March 1995 on the Surfers Paradise Street Circuit, Surfers Paradise, Queensland, Australia.

Qualifying results

Race

Notes 

 Average Speed 92.335 mph
 Michael Andretti was being chased by Bobby Rahal for second behind teammate Paul Tracy on the final lap. He caught a bit too much curb in the backstretch chicanes, inducing oversteer, and clipped the barrier.
Tracy's victory was the fifth in a row for Canadian drivers. Tracy won the final two races of 1994, and Jacques Villeneuve won the race before those two and the 1995 season opener. The next time five or more successive races were won by drivers of the same nationality would be in 1996.

External links
 Full Weekend Times & Results

Indycar Australia
Indycar Australia
Gold Coast Indy 300